Emerich, Emeric, Emerick and Emerik are given names and surnames. They may refer to:

Given name

Pre-modern era
 Saint Emeric of Hungary (c. 1007–1031), son of King Stephen I of Hungary
 Emeric, King of Hungary (1174–1204)
 Emeric Kökényesradnót (died 1285 or 1286), Hungarian baron and soldier

Modern era
 Emerik Blum (1911–1984), Bosnian Jewish businessman, philanthropist and founder of the conglomerate Energoinvest  
 Emerich Coreth (1919–2006), Austrian philosopher, Jesuit and Catholic priest
 Emerich Dembrovschi (born 1945), Romanian football striker
 E. W. Emo (1898–1975), Austrian film director
 Emerik Feješ (1904–1969), Serbian naïve painter
 Emerich B. Freed (1897–1955), Hungarian-born American federal judge
 Emerick Ishikawa (1920–2006), American weightlifter
 Emerich Jenei (born 1937), Romanian football player and coach
 Emerik Josipović (1834–1910), Croatian politician and 
 Emerich Juettner (1876–1955), Austrian-American counterfeiter of $1 bills
 Emeric Partos (1905–1975), Hungarian-born American fashion designer and furrier
 Emeric Pressburger (1902–1988), Hungarian-British screenwriter, film director and producer
 Emerik Stenberg (1873–1927), Swedish draftsman, painter and folklorist
 Emeric Thököly (1657–1705), Prince of Upper Hungary and Prince of Transylvania, leader of anti-Habsburg uprisings
 Emerich Vogl (1905–1971), Romanian football player of Hungarian ethnicity
 Emerich Ullmann (1861–1937), Austrian surgeon
 Emeric Essex Vidal (1791–1861), English naval officer and watercolourist

Surname
 Bob Emerick, American football player
 Fred Emerich (born 1945 or 1946), American politician 
 Geoff Emerick (1946–2018), English recording studio audio engineer, best known for his work with The Beatles
 Johann Emerich (died 1499), printer and typographer in the Holy Roman Empire
 John H. Emerick (1843–1902), leading Union Army telegraph operator during the American Civil War and business executive
 Martin Emerich (1846–1922), American politician
 Louis Emerick (born 1960), British actor
 Paul Emerick (born 1980), American rugby player
 Scotty Emerick (born 1973), American country music singer-songwriter
 Shannon Emerick, American stage actress and voice actress

Masculine given names